Shah Reza may refer to:

Rezā Shāh, Persian shah
Shah Reza, Lorestan, a village in Lorestan Province, Iran
Shah Reza, Mazandaran, a village in Mazandaran Province, Iran
 Shah Reza, a rapper from Bern, Switzerland

See also
Shahreza